Benjamin Edward Erb (December 3, 1892 – June 8, 1988) was an American rugby union player who played fullback for the United States men's national team in its first capped match in 1912.

Biography
Erb was born on December 3, 1892 in Minneapolis, Minnesota,  the son of John Erb and Rosa Erb (born Luedke). He was one of 10 children in a rugby-playing family and was raised in Vancouver, British Columbia. Erb attended Stanford University from 1908 until 1912, where he played for the rugby team and served as captain during his senior season. In 1910, he began playing rugby for the United States national team, joining them on their tour of Australia and New Zealand against club opposition. On November 16, 1912, Erb played for the United States at fullback in its first capped match against Australia. In that match, he scored one conversion "from a difficult angle" and one penalty goal from a distance of 40 yards. Erb was also included in the roster for the United States in their 1913 match against New Zealand, but did not make an appearance. Erb's younger brother, Arthur L. Erb, also attended Stanford and played rugby there.

Outside of rugby, Erb was drafted into the United States Army. He died in Novato, California on June 8, 1988.

References

1892 births
1988 deaths
American rugby union players
United States international rugby union players
Rugby union fullbacks